Ballet Afsaneh is a non-profit cultural organization devoted to the art, dance, music, and poetry of cultural heritage from Iran, Armenia, Turkmenistan, Afghanistan, Mongolia, China, and Uzbekistan. Ballet Afsaneh have performed at the British Museum and the San Francisco Asian Art Museum.

About 
Ballet Afsaneh was founded in 1986 by Sharlyn Sawyer in the San Francisco Bay Area. The dance troop has primarily consisted of women. The company's director Sharlyn Sawyer, a belly dancer, was a pioneer of Central Asian choreography in the late 1980s, and in 1998 choreographed the Balinese inspired piece Keep Her. Safe. Please!. The theme of the Silk Road featured heavily in Sawyer's choreography. She conducted field research learning about the music, dance and costumes of various ethnic communities.

The word "Afsaneh" is a Persian word and means "myth" or "fable". The dynamic group presents performances and activities featuring dance, poetry, and music of the Silk Road — the historic trade route that stretched thousands of kilometers across Central Asia from the China Sea in the east to the Mediterranean in the west. 

In 2003, Afsaneh Art and Culture Society launched a translation project. The aim of this project is to increase the visibility of the contemporary Iranian literature on the world stage, create a greater opportunity for the literature to be part of the modern conversation and to receive its deserved international recognition.

In 2005 the organization launched a cultural exchange project with artists in Tajikistan. The Tajik Dance Initiative engages Tajik artists, scholars and arts administrators with their international counterparts, creating opportunities for collaborative work, and support for the dance artists and related expressive arts of Tajikistan.

Performers and collaborators
Sharlyn Sawyer (Caucasian/American), Director
Aliah Najmabadi (Persian/Norwegian)
Sahar Dehghan (Persian/Iranian)
Miriam Peretz (Israeli/Moroccan), Assistant Director
Rosa Rojas (Mexican/American)
Tara Pandeya (Indian/German)
Hannah Romanowski (Russian/American)
Farima Berenji (Persian/Iranian)
Leila Sadeghi (Persian/Iranian)
Mariam Gaibova (Tajik)
Wan-Chao Chang (Taiwanese)
Jade Raybin (Caucasian/American)
Behrouz Sadeghian (Persian/Iranian)
Neema Hekmat (Persian/Iranian)
Pourya Khademi (Persian/Iranian)
Ashkan Ghafouri (Persian/Iranian)
Pesham Akhavass (Persian/Iranian)
Kaveh Heydayati (Persian/Iranian)
Salokhuddin Fakhriev (Uzbek/Tajik)
Tameem Afzali (Afghan/American)
Mohammad Nejad (Persian/Iranian)
Aziz Herawi (Tajik/Afghan)
Siamak Pouyan (Persian/Iranian)
Sherene Melania (Assyrian/American)
Emelie Mahdavian (American)
Kimberley Michelle (American)

Awards
The Persian Center of the Bay Area
The Shabe-Ashanaee Persian Cultural Organization
The Persian Students Association of Stanford University
Iranian American Society of New York
San Francisco Mayor Gavin Newsom humanities achievement award
Afghan Coalition
Iranian Federated Women's Club-Payvand School

See also
Persian dance
Persian traditional music
Iranian folk music

References

External links
Afsaneh Ballet-Official website
A collage of dance performances by Afsāneh Ballet, 2008, YouTube:  (4 min 22 sec).
 Short excerpts of two dances by Mirian Peretz with Afsaneh Ballet, 2007:  (3 min 32 sec).
 Excerpts of two performances by Afsaneh Ballet, San Mateo, California, 2007:  (1 min 18 sec),  (1 min 7 sec).
 A performance by Afsāneh Balleh at San Francisco City Hall Rotunda in celebration of the Iranian New Year, Nowruz, March 2007, YouTube:  (7 min 32 sec).

Persian classical music groups
Dance music groups
Dance companies
Iranian dances